Bongo District is one of the fifteen districts in Upper East Region, Ghana. Originally created as an ordinary district assembly in 1988; which was established by Legislative Instrument (L.I.) 1446. The municipality is located in the central part of Upper East Region and has Bongo as its capital town.

Geography and climate

Geography
Bongo District is near the town of Bolgatanga, the Upper East Region's capital. It shares borders with Kassena-Nankana District in the west and the Bolgatanga Municipal District in the south. The total area is 459 square kilometers.

Climate
The area is generally flat with occasional outcrops of rocks at an elevation of 200 m. The landscape has little vegetation. The landscape borders on the Sudan Savannah Zone although technically in the Guinea Savannah Zone. The area is in danger of desertification. There is an average of 70 rain days a year, with an annual rainfall of 600–1,400 mm.

Tourism
The Bongo Rocks is a top tourism site, which provides a beautiful view of all the Bongo district landscape, and allow an easy ascent. They have an intricate numbering system that leads to the top. The resonating rocks are hard to find. There are two large rocks of particular interest for hiking or climbing. One of the rocks offers great views around on top of a "mushroom" platform. The other rock has an unexplored underwater cave system, with a Christian cross on top.

Visiting Bongo during the rainy season, gives u an extra attraction to a swelling river connecting to the Vea Dam and Lake. Bongo is also home to mighty Baobab trees. Wildlife includes snakes like boas. There have also been rare sightings of elephants, monkeys and even lions.

Economy
The predominant occupation in Bongo District is subsistence farming along with some handicraft production.

Healthcare
The Bongo District has one District Hospital with 6 health centres located throughout the district.
There is only one eye care center in the entire district located at Yorogo which also serve many people across the region and beyond. It was founded by the Presbyterian Church of Ghana and it caters to people from all 3 regions in the northern part of Ghana.

Education
There are two senior secondary schools, thirteen junior secondary schools and forty primary schools.

Demographics
Nearly 90 percent of the district's inhabitants speak Gurene.

Sources
 
 Bongo District Website
 https://ghana-net.com/bongo.html

External links
 Soybean Demonstration Project Bongo, Ghana
 Hee Haw Hall of fame

References

Districts of Upper East Region